Korn is an American nu metal band from Bakersfield, California, formed in 1993. The band's current lineup includes founding members Jonathan Davis (vocals, bagpipes), James "Munky" Shaffer (guitar), Brian "Head" Welch (guitar, backing vocals), and Reginald "Fieldy" Arvizu (bass), with the addition of Ray Luzier (drums), who replaced the band's original member, David Silveria in 2007. Korn was originally formed by three of the members of the band L.A.P.D. Among their awards, Korn has earned two Grammy Awards out of eight nominations and two MTV Video Music Awards out of eleven nominations.

AMFT Awards

!Ref.
|-
| 2016
| "Rotting in Vain"
| Best Metal Performance
| 
|

ARTISTdirect Online Music Awards

|-
| 1999 || Korn || Favorite Pionerring Act || 
|-
| 1999 || Korn || Best Hard Rock Act || 
|-

BDS Spin Award
The Broadcast Data Systems, better known as BDS, is a service that tracks monitored radio, television and internet airplay of songs based on the number of spins and detections. Korn has received seven BDS Spin awards.

|-
| 2002 || "Make Me Bad" || 100,000 Spins || 
|-
| 2002 || "Here to Stay" || 100,000 Spins || 
|-
| 2002 || "Thoughtless" || 50,000 Spins || 
|-
| 2005 || "Did My Time" || 50,000 Spins || 
|-
| 2006 || "Got the Life" || 200,000 Spins || 
|-
| 2007 || "Coming Undone" || 100,000 Spins || 
|-
| 2007 || "Twisted Transistor" || 100,000 Spins || 
|-

Billboard Music Video Awards

!Ref.
|-
| rowspan=2|1999
| rowspan=2|"Freak on a Leash"
| Best Hard Rock Clip
| 
| rowspan=1|
|-
| Best Modern Rock Clip
| 
|

BMI Awards
The BMI Awards are accolades presented annually by Broadcast Music, Inc., honouring songwriters, composers, and music publishers in various genres. Korn has received 3 BMI awards.

|-
| 2004 || "Did My Time" || Most Played Song From a Motion Picture Soundtrack || 
|-
| 2008 || Korn || Best Rock || 
|-
| 2009 || Korn || Best Rock ||

BMI London Awards
The BMI London Awards are accolades presented annually by Broadcast Music, Inc., honouring songwriters, composers, and music publishers in various genres. Korn has received 1 BMI London award.

|-
| 2005 || "Another Brick In the Wall" || Best Pop Video ||

California Music Awards
Beginning in 1978 and continuing until the magazine ceased publication in 1999, BAM magazine presented the Bay Area Music Awards, also known as the Bammies, in an annual awards ceremony honoring accomplishments of the Bay Area music community. The awards ceremony continued for a couple more years with its name changed to the California Music Awards and absent its prior focus on the music of the Bay Area.

|-
| 1999 || "Follow the Leader" || Outstanding Pop/Rock Album || 
|-
| 1999 || Freak on a Leash || Outstanding Single || 
|-
| 2000 || "Issues" || Outstanding Hard Rock/Heavy Metal Album || 
|-

Circus Readers' Choice Awards

|-
| 1999 || Korn || Best Band of the New Millenium ||

Echo Awards
Echo Awards is a German music award granted every year by the Deutsche Phono-Akademie (an association of recording companies). Each year's winner is determined by the previous year's sales.

|-
| 2001 || "Issues" || Best International Rock/Alternative Group || 
|-
| 2003 || "Untouchables" || Best International Rock/Alternative Group || 
|-

Gracenote Silicon CD Award
The Gracenote Silicon Award was first awarded to Korn in 1999 for achieving high sales. The award is given for having high sales. 

|-
| 1999 || "Follow the Leader" || || 
|-
| 2000 || "Issues" || || 
|-

Grammy Awards
The Grammy Awards are awarded annually by the National Academy of Recording Arts and Sciences. Korn has received two awards from eight nominations.

|-
|  || "Shoots and Ladders" ||rowspan="2"| Best Metal Performance || 
|-
|  || "No Place to Hide" || 
|-
| rowspan="2"|  || rowspan="2"| "Freak on a Leash" || Best Hard Rock Performance || 
|-
| Best Short Form Music Video || 
|-
|  || "Here to Stay" ||rowspan="4"| Best Metal Performance || 
|-
|  || "Did My Time" || 
|-
|  || "Let the Guilt Go" || 
|-
|  || "Rotting in Vain" ||

Guitar Magazine Readers' Choice Awards

|-
| 1998 || "Follow the Leader" || Best Album of 1998 ||

Hit Parader Awards
The Hit Parader Awards were created by Hit Parader magazine in the 90's

|-
| 1998 || "Follow the Leader" || Favorite Album || 
|-
| 1998 || Korn || Favorite Band || 
|-
| 1999 || Korn || No. 1 Band || 
|-
| 1999 || "Issues" || No. 1 Album ||

Hungarian Music Awards
The Hungarian Music Awards are handed out annually by the Hungarian Recording Industry Association. 

!Ref.
|-
| 2000
| Issues
| Best Foreign Rock Album
| 
| 
|-
| 2017
| rowspan=2|The Serenity of Suffering
| rowspan=2|Best Foreign Hard Rock or Metal Album
| 
| 
|-
| 2018
| 
|

Metals Edge Readers' Choice Awards

|-
| 1999 || "Freak on a Leash" || Music Video of the Year || 
|-
| 1999 || "Issues" || Album of the Year || 
|-
| 1999 || "Issues" || Album Cover of the Year || 
|-
| 1999 || "Falling Away from Me || Song of the Year || 
|-
| 1999 || Korn || Band of the Year || 
|-
| 1999 || Jonathan Davis || Vocalist of the Year || 
|-
| 1999 || Fieldy || Bassist of the Year || 
|-
| 2002 || "Here to Stay" || Music Video of the Year || 
|-
| 2002 || Korn || Comeback of the Year || 
|-
| 2002 || "Untouchables" || Album of the Year || 
|-
| 2002 || "Untouchables" || Album Cover of the Year || 
|-
| 2002 || Fieldy || Bassist of the Year || 
|-
| 2003 || "Did My Time" || Best Song From a Movie Soundtrack || 
|-
| 2003 || Korn || Favorite Ozzfest Band ||

Metal Hammer Awards 'Germany'

|-
| rowspan=2|1997
| rowspan=2|"Korn"
| Best New Band
| 
|-
| Best Live Band
|

Metal Storm Awards

|-
| 2005 || "See You On the Other Side" || Best Alternative Metal Album || 
|-
| 2011 || "The Path Of Totality" || Best Electronic Metal Album || 
|-
| 2016 || "The Serenity Of Suffering" || Best Alternative Metal Album || 
|-
| 2016 || "The Serenity Of Suffering" || Biggest Surprise || 
|-

MTV Video Music Awards
The MTV Video Music Awards were established in 1984 by MTV to celebrate the top music videos of the year. Korn has received two awards from eleven nominations.

|-
| rowspan="9"|  || rowspan="9"| "Freak on a Leash" || Best Rock Video || 
|-
| Breakthrough Video || 
|-
| Best Direction || 
|-
| Best Special Effects || 
|-
| Best Art Direction || 
|-
| Best Editing || 
|-
| Best Cinematography || 
|-
| Viewer's Choice || 
|-
| Video of the Year || 
|-
|  || "Falling Away from Me" || Best Rock Video || 
|-
|  || "Here to Stay" || Best Rock Video ||

MTV Europe Music Awards
The MTV Europe Music Awards is an annual awards ceremony established in 1994 by MTV Europe. Korn has received four nominations.

|-
| 2000 || Korn || Best Rock Act || 
|-
| 2002 || Korn || Best Rock Act || 
|-
| 2002 || Korn || Best Live Act || 
|-
| 2006 || Korn || Best Alternative Act ||

MTV Asia Awards
The MTV Asia Awards is an annual Asian awards ceremony established in 2002 by the MTV television network. Korn has received one award.

|-
| 2006 || "Twisted Transistor" || Favorite Video ||

Music Television Awards

|-
| 1999 || "Got the Life" || Best Rock Act || 
|-
| 2000 || Korn || Best Rock Act || 
|-
| 2000 || "Falling Away From Me" || Best Music Video || 
|-

Music Video Production Awards
The MVPAs are annually presented by a Los Angeles-based music trade organization to honor the year's best music videos.

|-
| 2001 || "Make Me Bad" || Best Makeup in a Music Video ||

Revolver Golden Gods Awards
The Revolver Golden Gods Awards is an annual awards ceremony established in 2009 by Revolver Magazine. This ceremony celebrates the best in hard rock and heavy metal music. Korn has received one award from five nominations.

|-
| 2010 || Jonathan Davis || Best Vocalist || 
|-
| rowspan="4"| 2012 || Jonathan Davis || Best Vocalist || 
|-
| James "Munky" Shaffer || Riff Lord || 
|-
| Reginald "Fieldy" Arvizu || Best Bassist || 
|-
| The Path of Totality || Album of the Year || 
|-
| rowspan="4"| 2014 || Jonathan Davis || Best Vocalist || 
|-
| Brian "Head" Welch and James "Munky" Shaffer || Best Guitarists || 
|-
| Reginald "Fieldy" Arvizu || Best Bassist || 
|-
| The Paradigm Shift || Album of the Year ||

Octane’s Year-End Awards

|-
| 2016 || Korn || Artist of the Year || 
|-
| 2016 || "The Serenity Of Suffering" || Octane Album of the Year ||

Kerrang! Awards
The Kerrang! Awards is an annual awards ceremony established in 1993 by Kerrang! Magazine. This ceremony celebrates the best in hard rock and heavy metal music. Korn has received three awards from eight nominations.

!Ref.
|-
| rowspan="6" | 1997 
| rowspan="3" | Korn
| Best New Band
| 
| rowspan="6" style="text-align:center;" |
|-
| Best International Live Act
| 
|-
| Best International Newcomer
| 
|-
| Life Is Peachy 
| Best Album 
| 
|-
| "A.D.I.D.A.S."
| Best Video
| 
|-
| "Good God"
| Best Single
| 
|-
| 2002 
| "Here to Stay" 
| Best Single 
| 
|
|-
| 2011 
| Korn 
| Hall of Fame 
| 
|

Loudwire Music Awards
The Loudwire Music Awards is an annual awards ceremony presented by Loudwire Magazine. This ceremony celebrates the best in hard rock and heavy metal music. Korn has received five nominations.

|-
| rowspan="4"| 2013 || "Love & Meth" || Song of the Year || 
|-
| "Never Never" || Rock Video of the Year || 
|-
| Korn || Live Act of the Year || 
|-
| Korn || Rock Band of the Year || 
|-
| 2017 || Korn || Hard Rock Artist of the Year ||

MuchMusic Video Awards
The MuchMusic Video Awards is an annual awards ceremony presented by the Canadian music video channel MuchMusic. Korn has received one award from three nominations.

|-
| 1999 || Korn || Best International Group|| 
|-
| 1999 || "Freak on a Leash" || Best International Video || 
|-
| 2002 || "Here to Stay" || Best International Video (Group) ||

Drummies! Awards
The Drummies! Awards is an annual awards ceremony presented by Drum! Magazine. This ceremony celebrates the best drummers in many different music genres. Korn has received two awards from six nominations.

|-
| 1998 || David Silveria || Punk Drummer Of The Year || 
|-
| rowspan="2"| 1999 || rowspan="2"| David Silveria || Drummer Of The Year || 
|-
| Mainstream Rock Drummer Of The Year || 
|-
| rowspan="2"| 2000 || rowspan="2"| David Silveria || Drummer Of The Year || 
|-
| Best Alternative Rock Drummer || 
|-
| 2013 || Ray Luzier || Best Rock/Metal Drummer || 
|-
| 2022 || Ray Luzier || Best Rock/Metal Drummer ||

Alternative Press Music Awards
Korn has received eight awards, and thirteen nominations. 
|-
| 1998 || Korn || Best Artist || 
|-
| 1998 || "Follow the Leader" || Best Album || 
|-
| 1998 || "Follow the Leader" || Best Album Cover Art || 
|-
| 1998 || Korn || Best Live Act || 
|-
| 1998 || "Got the Life" || Best Radio Single || 
|-
| 1998 || "Korn" || Best Album of the 90's || 
|-
| 1998 || "Family Values Tour" || Best Concert Event || 
|-
| 1998 || "Got the Life" || Best Video || 
|-
| 1999 || Korn || Brightest Hope || 
|-
| rowspan="4"| 2017  || Reginald "Fieldy" Arvizu || Best Bassist || 
|- 
| rowspan="2" | Korn || Best Hard Rock Artist || 
|-
| Vanguard Award || 
|- 
| "Insane" || Best Music Video || 

Pollstar Concert Industry Awards

!Ref.
|-
| 2001
| Tour| Most Creative Stage Production
| 
| 

Rolling Stone Music Awards
This is an annual awards ceremony established in 1989 by Rolling Stone. Korn has received three awards, and four nominations.

|-
| 1998 || Korn || Best Hard Rock Band || 
|-
| 1998 || Korn || Best Rock Band || 
|-
| 1998 || Korn || Best Tour || 
|-
| 1998 || "Follow the Leader" || Best Hard Rock Album || 

Spin Readers' Choice Awards

|-
| 1998 || "Follow the Leader" || Favorite Album || 

Teen Choice Awards
The Teen Choice Awards is an awards show presented annually by the Fox Broadcasting Company. Korn has received one nomination

|-
| 2000 || Korn || Choice Rock Group || 

World Music Awards
The World Music Awards is an international awards show founded in 1989 that annually honors recording artists based on worldwide sales figures provided by the International Federation of the Phonographic Industry (IFPI). John Martinotti is an executive producer and co-founder of the show. The awards show is conducted under the patronage of H.S.H. Prince Albert of Monaco, Monte-Carlo.

|-
| align="center"| 2014 || "Korn" || Best Live Act || 
|-
| align="center"| 2014 || "Korn" || Best Group || 
|-
| align="center"| 2014 || "The Paradigm Shift" || Best Album || 
|-

Žebřík Music Awards

!Ref.
|-
| 1996
| rowspan=2|Korn
| Best International Surprise
| 
| 
|-
| rowspan=3|1999
| Best International Group
| 
| rowspan=7|
|-
| rowspan=2|"Falling Away from Me"
| Best International Song
| 
|-
| rowspan=2|Best International Video
| 
|-
| rowspan=2|2000
| "Somebody Someone"
| 
|-
| rowspan=2|Korn
| rowspan=2|Best International Group
| 
|-
| rowspan=2|2002
| 
|-
| Untouchables| rowspan=2|Best International Album
| 
|-
| rowspan=3|2005
| See You on the Other Side| 
| rowspan=3|
|-
| Korn
| Best International Group
| 
|-
| "Twisted Transistor"
| Best International Video
| 
|-
| rowspan=4|2007
| Korn
| Best International Group
| 
| rowspan=4|
|-
| Untitled''
| Best International Album
| 
|-
| rowspan=2|"Evolution"
| Best International Song
| 
|-
| rowspan=2|Best International Video
| 
|-
| 2013
| "Never Never"
| 
|

References

Awards
Lists of awards received by American musician
Lists of awards received by musical group